Komban is a 2015 Indian Tamil-language action drama film directed by M. Muthaiah and produced by Studio Green. The film stars Karthi and Lakshmi Menon, while Rajkiran, Super Subbarayan, Thambi Ramaiah, Karunas, and Kovai Sarala play supporting roles. G. V. Prakash Kumar composed the film's music. The film released on 2 April 2015 to positive reviews.

Plot
Kombiah Pandian aka Komban is a good-hearted but short-tempered man living in a village with his mother Kottaiamma in Ramanathapuram. Komban cannot tolerate injustice in any form and repels against it immediately without fearing about its after effects. He falls in love with Pazhani, the only daughter of Muthiah. Kottaiamma approaches Muthiah with a wedding proposal between their children. Muthiah agrees for the wedding seeing Komban's kind heart. However, he has a fear that Komban's short temper would make him land in problems. Komban and Pazhani then get married.

Gundan Ramasamy is a corrupt politician who goes to any extent for power and money. Komban locks horns with Ramasamy, and trouble erupts between them. Muthiah is even more worried, knowing that this would put Komban's life at risk. One day, Ramasamy kidnaps Pazhani with the plans of bringing Komban to his place, but Muthiah sees this and goes for rescue. In the meantime, a fight ensues, and Muthiah hits at Ramasamy and his men. Now, Ramasamy is even more angered and wants to avenge both Komban and Muthiah.

A temple festival comes during which Muthiah is worshipped as the godman. Ramasamy and his men decide to use the festival to kill Komban and Muthiah. However, Komban retaliates and kills Ramasamy. He also saves Muthiah.

Cast

 Karthi as Kombaiah Pandian a.k.a. Komban
 Lakshmi Menon as Pazhani Kombaiah Pandian
 Rajkiran as Muthaiyah, Pazhani's father
 Super Subbarayan as Gundan Ramasamy
 Thambi Ramaiah as Rajakili, Kottaiamma's younger brother
 Karunas as Muniyandi, Kombaiah Pandian's elder brother
 Kovai Sarala as Kottaiamma, Kombaiah Pandian's mother
 I. M. Vijayan as Muthukalai, Gundan Ramasamy's elder son
 Sai Dheena as Santhanakalai, Gundan Ramasamy's second son
 Arunmozhithevan as Gundan Ramasamy's youngest son
 G. Gnanasambandam as Magistrate
 Vela Ramamoorthy as Duraipandi
 Veerasamar as Amavasai
 G. Marimuthu as Pattasu
 Namo Narayana
 George Maryan as Tea Master
 Maha Gandhi as Bhairava
 Stalin as Inspector Inbanathan
 Hello Kandasamy as Constable
 Guru as Alangaram
 Yogi Babu as First Man in Fight
 DMJ Rajasimhan
 Dharani
 Rajalingam
 Padman
 Baba Bhaskar (special appearance in the song "Karuppu Nerathazhagi")

Production
Studio Green announced that their next production would start from June 2014 with M. Muthaiah of Kutti Puli (2013) fame taking charge of the direction and that the film would feature Karthi in a rural based role for the second time following his debut film Paruthiveeran (2007). Yuvan Shankar Raja was initially reported to be composing the film's score and soundtrack, but he was replaced with G. V. Prakash Kumar in July 2014. Velraj handled the film's cinematography. Praveen K. L. was selected to be the film's editor. Sri Divya was first reported to be the female lead, but the role went to Lakshmi Menon, who also was the maker's first choice, while Rajkiran was selected to play a pivotal role. Stunt choreographer Super Subbarayan was cast for an antagonistic role. Malayalam actor and former footballer I. M. Vijayan was chosen to portray another villain in the film. Comedian Karunas and character artist Thambi Ramaiah were added to the cast as well.

The team announced that the film would be a start-to-finish affair and the film's shoots would be wrapped up in 70 days' time. Principal photography took place on 18 June 2014. Karthi's father, actor Sivakumar attended the event. Karthi was reported to have grown a handlebar moustache and beard for his character. He also put on weight for the role. Most of the scenes were also shot at Mudukulathur. 50% of the film was completed by early October 2014.

Soundtrack

G. V. Prakash Kumar composed the soundtrack album and background score for the film, the third time he collaborated with Karthi, after Aayirathil Oruvan (2010) and Saguni (2012). Shreya Ghoshal recorded a song in the film. The lyrics were written by Ra. Thanikodi and Mahalingam.

Release
The satellite rights of the film were sold to Sun TV. The Hindi dubbed version titled Daringbaaz 2 was released in 2017.

Reception

The film received positive reviews from critics.

M. Suganth of The Times of India gave 2.5 stars out of 5 and wrote, "The problem, though, is not the similarity of the characters or predictability of the plot, but the lack of real excitement in most of the scenes…The film hums along, moving from one scene to the next, without really making much of an impact in the viewer". Gautaman Bhaskaran of The Hindustan Times rated 3 out of 5 and wrote, "Komban is an endless roll of flashing knives and gritting teeth…Komban is hardly worth the time or money". Baradwaj Rangan of The Hindu wrote, "Komban: So dull...that's the real controversy". Filmibeat rated the film 3 stars out of 5, writing, "Packed with all the elements required for a successful commercial entertainer, Komban delivers the goods." Indiaglitz rated the film 3.25 stars out of 5, calling it "a raging bull".

The movie was heavily criticized by K. Krishnasamy the leader of the dalit party Puthiya Tamilagam and many dalit political leaders for its glorification of caste and was accused of fomenting intercaste violence in the state of Tamilnadu.

References

External links
 

2015 films
2010s Tamil-language films
Indian action drama films
2010s masala films
Films scored by G. V. Prakash Kumar
Films directed by M. Muthaiah
2015 action drama films